Fahim Muntasir Rahman (born 1 November 1980) is a former Bangladeshi cricketer who played in three Test matches and three One Day Internationals from 2001 to 2002.

1980 births
Living people
Bangladesh Test cricketers
Bangladesh One Day International cricketers
Bangladeshi cricketers
Dhaka Division cricketers
Khulna Division cricketers
People from Mymensingh